Kyle Edward Keller (born January 16, 1968) is an American basketball coach, currently the head coach for the Stephen F. Austin Lumberjacks men's basketball team. Previously, he served as an assistant coach at Texas A&M, Kansas, Oklahoma State, UTSA, Louisiana Tech and head coach at Tyler Junior College.

Early coaching career 
Keller started his coaching career as an assistant at Louisiana Tech. After a four-year stint, Keller joined the staff at Tyler Junior College before taking a position as an assistant at Texas-San Antonio for one season. In 1997, Keller returned to Tyler Junior College and accepted his first head coaching job. Keller joined the staff of head coach Eddie Sutton at Oklahoma State in 1999, where he would remain until 2008. Keller's time in Stillwater was marred by the plane crash that killed 10 players and staffers in early 2001, including Keller's cousin, Nate Fleming, who replaced Keller on the plane during a last-minute switch. Keller's experience and that of Fleming's family in the aftermath of the crash was documented by ESPN's Outside the Lines in 2011. Following the resignation of then-head coach Sean Sutton in 2008, Keller relocated to Kansas where he served as an assistant to Bill Self. After three seasons, Keller became an assistant to Billy Kennedy at Texas A&M. In 2016, Keller accepted the head coaching position at Stephen F. Austin following the departure of Brad Underwood to Oklahoma State.

Head coaching career

Stephen F. Austin 
On April 4, 2016, Keller was hired as the head coach at Stephen F. Austin. He replaced Brad Underwood who left after 3 seasons to become the head coach at Oklahoma State. SFA athletic director Robert Hill said in a statement, "Kyle brings a wealth of experience having worked for great coaches like Eddie Sutton, Bill Self and Billy Kennedy. This experience will fit well to continue our SFA basketball culture of winning championships and making NCAA tournament appearances. He cares deeply for his players and is a wonderful husband and father. We are so happy he has agreed to become a Lumberjack. I look forward to having our fans and students get to know him."

Keller won his first game as a Division I head coach against the Longwood Lancers on November 15, 2016. Keller led Stephen F. Austin to an 18–15 record in his first season. In 2017–18, Stephen F. Austin finished 28–7, won the 2018 Southland tournament as the no. 3 seed, and appeared in the NCAA tournament. Keller reached 100 wins on February 11, 2021, making him the fastest coach at SFA to reach this milestone.

Keller is known for his stifling, unique defense.  SFA led the nation in forced turnovers and steals in 2018 AND 2020 and are on pace to end 2021 in the top 15.  In 2020, SFA was top 10 in the nation in 8 categories.  In 2021, SFA is 2nd in the nation with field-goal percentage, and is Top 10 in the nation in categories.

On November 26, 2019, Stephen F. Austin upset no. 1 Duke 85–83 in overtime, giving Duke their first non-conference home loss in 150 games. Stephen F. Austin finished the 2019–20 season with a 28–3 (19–1 Southland) record and the regular season Southland title. However, due to the COVID-19 pandemic, the Southland and NCAA tournaments were cancelled.  He also led the team to two other Power 5 victories, 59-58 vs Baylor and 83-82 over LSU.

Following the discovery of an administrative error in declaring student-athletes eligible, on May 20, 2020, Stephen F. Austin reached an agreement with the NCAA to vacate hundreds of wins across multiple sports from 2013 to 2019, including all 117 men's basketball wins from the 2014–15 to 2018–19 seasons.

In 2021-2022, SFA were co-champions in the WAC.  Kyle Keller is currently the 19th most winning basketball coach in all the NCAA of coaches that have been a head coach for a minimum of 4 years.

Head coaching record

Personal 
A native of Dallas, Texas, Keller attended Oklahoma State University where he played baseball. He is married to Chaunsea Keller and has two children: Kenzie and Kemper.

References 

1968 births
Living people
American men's basketball coaches
Basketball coaches from Texas
Basketball players from Dallas
College men's basketball head coaches in the United States
Junior college men's basketball coaches in the United States
Kansas Jayhawks men's basketball coaches
Louisiana Tech Bulldogs basketball coaches
Louisiana Tech University alumni
Oklahoma State Cowboys baseball players
Oklahoma State Cowboys basketball coaches
Sportspeople from Dallas
Stephen F. Austin Lumberjacks basketball coaches
Texas A&M Aggies men's basketball coaches
UTSA Roadrunners men's basketball coaches